The Kremlin Cup is a professional tennis tournament played on indoor hard courts, which was suspended in 2022. It was part of the ATP Tour 250 series of the ATP Tour and was a Premier Tournament on the WTA Tour. It was held annually at the Olympic Stadium in Moscow, Russia from 1990 to 2018. In 2019, the Olympic Stadium underwent a reconstruction lasting two years. The 2019 edition of the tournament was held at the Ice Palace Krylatskoye. In 2021, the Kremlin Cup was played at the Irina Viner-Usmanova Gymnastics Palace and the Luzhniki Palace of Sports.

Until 2007, it was held on a carpet surface. It was then held on RuKortHard surface until 2015. Since 2016 the tournament has been held on TPSurface.

In light of the 2022 Russian invasion of Ukraine, the Association of Tennis Professionals (ATP) and the Women's Tennis Association (WTA) suspended the 2022 Kremlin Cup.

Past finals

Singles

Men

Women

Doubles

Men

Women

References

External links

Official website
ATP tournament profile
WTA tournament profile

 
Annual events in Moscow
Sports competitions in Moscow
Tennis tournaments in Russia
Indoor tennis tournaments
Hard court tennis tournaments
WTA Tour
ATP Tour 250
Recurring sporting events established in 1990
Annual sporting events in Russia
1990 establishments in Russia